Bibianów  is a village in the administrative district of Gmina Parzęczew, within Zgierz County, Łódź Voivodeship, in central Poland. It lies just south-west of the town of Ozorków.

References

Villages in Zgierz County